The Governor of Salta is a citizen of the Salta Province, in Argentina, holding the office of governor for the corresponding period. The governor is elected alongside a vice-governor. Currently the governor of Salta is Gustavo Sáenz.

Governors since 1983

See also
 Legislature of Salta
 Senate of Salta
 Chamber of Deputies of Salta

References

Salta Province
Salta Province